Dennis Burton (December 6, 1933 – July 8, 2013) was a Canadian modernist painter.

Biography 
He was born in 1933 in Lethbridge, Alberta. He won a scholarship to Pickering College in Newmarket, and then attended the Ontario College of Art, studying with Jock Macdonald and Fred Hagan. He worked as a graphic designer for the Canadian Broadcasting Company until 1960 when he began painting full-time.

An exhibition in 1955 of Painters Eleven at Toronto's Hart House (today the Justina M. Barnicke Gallery, Art Museum at the University of Toronto) which he visited with his friend, artist Gordon Rayner, turned him towards abstraction. Under the influence of the neo-Dada movement current in Toronto in the late 1950s and first half of the 1960s, Burton began to create sculpture using scrap metal and found materials welded together.

He showed his work with Toronto's Isaacs Gallery (1961, 1962, 1965). For this reason, he has been called part of the Isaacs Group of artists, which include, among others, Michael Snow, Joyce Wieland, John Meredith and Graham Coughtry.

Burton had a number of public commissions, among them a mural for the Edmonton Airport in 1963. He is best known for the Garterbeltmania works of females in their underwear which he showed with the Robert McLaughlin Gallery in Oshawa in his retrospective in 1977. With artists such as Joyce Wieland, he explored the erotic theme in Canadian art. These works made politician John Diefenbaker denounce Dennis Burton in the House of Commons, coining the term "garter belt-maniac". But both before and after these works, he created large abstractions that might involve using different creative strategies involving language, colour and form.

Burton`s papers are in the Dennis Burton fonds, Edward P. Taylor Library & Archives, Art Gallery of Ontario, Toronto, CA ON00012 SC100.

On July 8, 2013, Dennis Burton died at age 79.

Collections 
Art Gallery of Ontario, Toronto 
The Canada Council Art Bank Collection
The Hirshhorn Museum, Washington
Glenbow Museum, Calgary
Los Angeles County Museum 
Montreal Museum of Fine Arts
National Gallery of Canada, Ottawa
Robert McLaughlin Gallery, Oshawa
Smithsonian Institution, Washington
Southern Alberta Art Gallery, Lethbridge
Vancouver Art Gallery
Walker Art Center, Minneapolis

References

Bibliography

Further reading 
Nasgaard, Roald. Abstract Painting in Canada. Vancouver: Douglas & McIntyre, 2008. 

1933 births
2013 deaths
Artists from Alberta
OCAD University alumni
People from Lethbridge
20th-century Canadian painters
Canadian abstract artists
Canadian muralists
Canadian collage artists
Skowhegan School of Painting and Sculpture alumni